With seventy percent of Colombia's power generation, hydroelectric power is a very important national energy source. The total large hydropower potential for Colombia is estimated at 93GW, with an additional 25GW of small hydropower (<20MW). However, the potential for large hydropower faces difficulties, as the best sites have already been developed, also due to the escalating environmental and social costs associated with large dams, and the likely impacts of climate change and climate variability on the hydrological regime of the country (drastic increases in surface temperature in the Andes, changes in precipitation patterns, and increases in the intensity and frequency of El Niño-Southern Oscillation (ENSO) signals driving prolonged periods of drought).

Proposed hydroelectric power plants
The large hydropower plants to be built in Colombia up to 2010 are listed below:

 Calderas Dam: 26MW
 Transvase Guarinó
 Amoyá river: 80MW
 Manso river: 27 MW
 Quimbo Dam: 400 MW

See also

Electricity sector in Colombia
List of power stations in Colombia
Renewable energy in Colombia
Renewable energy by country

References